The 1977–78 New England Whalers season was the Whalers' sixth season of operation in the World Hockey Association (WHA). This season saw the debut of Gordie Howe and his sons with the Whalers' franchise. The trio helped the Whalers advance to the Avco Cup final, where they were defeated by the Winnipeg Jets.

Offseason

Regular season

Final standings

Schedule and results

Playoffs

New England Whalers 4, Edmonton Oilers 1 – Division Quarterfinals

New England Whalers 4, Quebec Nordiques 1 – Division Semifinals

Winnipeg Jets 4, New England Whalers 1 – Avco Cup Finals

Player statistics

Note: Pos = Position; GP = Games played; G = Goals; A = Assists; Pts = Points; +/- = plus/minus; PIM = Penalty minutes; PPG = Power-play goals; SHG = Short-handed goals; GWG = Game-winning goals
      MIN = Minutes played; W = Wins; L = Losses; T = Ties; GA = Goals-against; GAA = Goals-against average; SO = Shutouts;

Awards and records

Transactions

Draft picks
New England's draft picks at the 1977 WHA Amateur Draft.

Farm teams

See also
1977–78 WHA season

References

External links

New
New
New England Whalers seasons
New England
New England